The 2013–14 season was Juventus Football Club's 116th in existence and seventh consecutive season in the top flight of Italian football. The club won their third Serie A title in a row with a record 102 points and 33 wins, finishing 17 points ahead of second-place Roma.

Players

Squad information
Players and squad numbers last updated on 1 February 2014.Note: Flags indicate national team as has been defined under FIFA eligibility rules. Players may hold more than one non-FIFA nationality.

Non-playing staff

Source: Juventus.com (archive link)

Transfers

In

Total spending:  €23 million

Out

Total income:  €26.75 million

Pre-season and friendlies

Competitions

Supercoppa Italiana

Serie A

League table

Results summary

Results by round

Matches

Coppa Italia

Juventus started the Coppa Italia directly in the round of 16, as one of the eight best seeded teams.

UEFA Champions League

Group stage

UEFA Europa League

Knockout phase

Round of 32

Round of 16

Quarter-finals

Semi-finals

Statistics

Appearances and goals

|-
! colspan=14 style="background:#DCDCDC; text-align:center"| Goalkeepers

|-
! colspan=14 style="background:#DCDCDC; text-align:center"| Defenders

|-
! colspan=14 style="background:#DCDCDC; text-align:center"| Midfielders

|-
! colspan=14 style="background:#DCDCDC; text-align:center"| Forwards

|-
! colspan=14 style="background:#DCDCDC; text-align:center"| Players transferred out during the season

Goalscorers

Last updated: 18 May 2014

Disciplinary record

Last updated: 18 May 2014

References

Juventus F.C. seasons
Juventus
Juventus
Italian football championship-winning seasons